The Debbie Meyer Green Bag are food storage bags sold and licensed by Housewares America, Inc.

Independent laboratory results (Nova Biologicals, Inc - Conroe, Texas) and television commercials for the product claim it will keep fruits and vegetables fresh longer, (some items for up to 21 days) by absorbing ethylene gas.  The bags' ethylene absorption is intended to slow the ripening (and thus the decaying) process and preserve the produce's shelf life. The product's packaging acknowledges that certain vegetables and fruits are preserved better in the bags than others (strawberries, for example, are only advertised to last about nine days in a Green Bag compared to over three weeks for cabbage or carrots). They also can be used to keep cut flowers fresh longer as well. Debbie Meyer GreenBags are available on HSN, retail stores and on Amazon, where they have a 4.5 star rating with over 20,000 reviews.

Effectiveness 
In 2009, a US-based expert microbiology testing firm performed third party testing on Debbie Meyer Green Bags in their controlled lab environment. The results from their findings had concluded that produce stored in Green Bags had less deterioration and thus more value than produce stored in regular commercial packaging, or that of a competitor which was also tested.

Several television news programs have broadcast consumer affairs segments on the product.  KDKA-TV Channel 2 News in Pittsburgh featured Debbie Meyer Green Bags in its recurring "Does It Really Do That?" segment and discovered mostly positive results.   KDKA reported that "strawberries, bananas and tomatoes" spoiled in standard storage faster than in the GreenBags.  While the Green Bags did keep carrots and green peppers "much fresher much longer".

WPVI-TV in Philadelphia also reported on the bags.  The station had a viewer keep a log for thirty days.  They tested Debbie Meyer Green Bags against Ziploc Storage Bags, Ziploc Storage Containers, and the food items' original packaging.  While some items did better in the Green Bags, the tester felt "Green Bags and Ziploc bags and Ziploc storage containers maintained the freshness of the produce about the same."

One station, KTVI-TV in St. Louis, has given Green Bags a very positive review.  They tested the bags for their Deal or Dud segment and found the bags kept both fruits and vegetables fresher.  They called the bags “a Deal”.

Debbie Meyer Green Bags have been show in many tests by consumers and in independent laboratory tests to outperform other types of storage bags and storage containers. Items do need to wiped out periodically in the Debbie Meyer Green Bags to eliminate moisture inside the bags.

Footnotes 

Bags
Containers